Ellen Wood may refer to:

 Ellen Wood (author) (1814–1887), English novelist, better known as "Mrs. Henry Wood"
 Ellen Meiksins Wood (1942—2016), historian and critic of political theory
 Ellen Thelma Wood (1901–1970), artist, model for Robin Vote in Djuna Barnes's novel Nightwood

See also
Helen Wood (disambiguation)